Town of a Million Dreams is the sixth studio album by Australian country singer Casey Barnes and was released on 17 April 2020 through Chugg Music. It was the first Barnes album released on the label, after signing with them in 2019. Town of a Million Dreams peaked at number 16 on the ARIA Albums Chart.
 
The album contained the singles "Sparks Fly", which speak eight consecutive weeks at number one on The Music Network Country Radio Charts and "We're Good Together", which spent five weeks atop the same chart.
 
At the 2020 ARIA Music Awards, the album was nominated for  Best Country Album.
 
At the Country Music Awards of Australia of 2021, the album was nominated for Contemporary Country Album of the Year and Album of the Year.

Track listing
 "A Little More" – 3:19
 "We're Good Together" – 2:59
 "No Other You" – 3:33
 "Sparks Fly" – 2:58
 "Fine Wine" – 3:02
 "All I Need" – 3:37
 "Bright Lights" – 4:00
 "Heartbreaker" – 2:54
 "The Lucky Ones" – 3:04
 "City Girls" – 3:36

Charts

Weekly charts

Year-end charts

References

 

2020 albums
Casey Barnes albums